The 1925–26 season was the 53rd season of competitive football in Scotland and the 36th season of the Scottish Football League.

Scottish League Division One 

Champions: Celtic
Relegated: Raith Rovers, Clydebank

Scottish League Division Two 

Promoted: Dunfermline Athletic, Clyde
Relegated: Broxburn United

Scottish League Division Three 

Elected to Division Two: Forfar Athletic

Since multiple clubs were unable to complete their fixtures due to financial difficulties, the championship was withheld, and consequently, the Third Division was dissolved, not being re-established until the 1946–47 season.

Eight of the clubs that competed in the unfinished season are now defunct; of the remainder, Forfar Athletic and Montrose play in the league as of 2022, with Brechin City, Leith Athletic, Mid-Annandale, Peebles Rovers, Royal Albert and Vale of Leven playing in lower levels.

Scottish Cup 

St Mirren were winners of the Scottish Cup after a 2–0 final win over Division One champions Celtic.

Other honours

National

County 

. * aggregate over two legs

Highland League

Junior Cup 
Strathclyde were winners of the Junior Cup after a 2–0 win over Bridgeton Waverley in the final.

Scotland national team 

Scotland was winner of the 1925–26 British Home Championship.

Key:
 (H) = Home match
 (A) = Away match
 BHC = British Home Championship

Notes and references

External links 
 Scottish Football Historical Archive

 
Seasons in Scottish football